KXXQ (100.7 FM) is a radio station broadcasting a Catholic radio format, with most programming coming from the Relevant Radio network. Licensed to Milan, New Mexico, United States, the station is owned by Relevant Radio, Inc.

History
The station was assigned the call letters KDYC on December 7, 1989.  On January 1, 1991, the station changed its call sign to KZNM, on June 23, 1997 to KQEO, on July 13, 1999 to KQEO-FM, and on August 30, 1999 to the current KXXQ.

Translators
KXXQ's relayed throughout the state on these translators:

References

External links
 
 

Relevant Radio stations
Radio stations established in 1989
1989 establishments in New Mexico
XXQ
Cibola County, New Mexico
Catholic Church in New Mexico